Uncial 0306 (in the Gregory-Aland numbering), is a Greek uncial manuscript of the New Testament. Paleographically it has been assigned to the 9th century.

Description 

The codex contains a small texts of the Gospel of John 9:22-10:3.5-8.10-12; 11:6-37.39-41, on 7 illuminated parchment leaves (29 cm by 22.5 cm). It is written in two columns per page, 25 lines per page, in uncial letters. It is a palimpsest. The upper text belongs to the lectionary ℓ 368.

Currently it is dated by the INTF to the 9th century.

The Text was published in 2007. 

It is currently housed at the Bodleian Library (Selden Supra 9, fol. 114-120) in Oxford.

See also 

 List of New Testament uncials
 Biblical manuscripts
 Textual criticism

References

External links 

 0306: Oxford, Bodleian Library, Selden Supra 9, fols. 114-20 (lower script)

Greek New Testament uncials
9th-century biblical manuscripts
Palimpsests
Bodleian Library collection